Bear Creek Camp Conservation Area is a park and conservation area in Bear Creek Township, Luzerne County, Pennsylvania. It is mostly made up of thick forests, streams, and lakes.

Activities
Hiking
Biking
Fishing
Boating
Skiing
Snowboarding

Numbered routes

References

Protected areas of Luzerne County, Pennsylvania
Tourist attractions in Luzerne County, Pennsylvania